"Had I but known" is a form of prolepsis or foreshadowing that hints at some looming disaster in which the first-person narrator laments their course of action which precipitates some or other unfortunate series of actions. 

Classically, the narrator never makes explicit the nature of the mistake until both the narrator and the reader have realized the consequence of the error. If done well, this literary device can add suspense or dramatic irony; if overdone, it invites comparison of the story to Victorian melodrama and sub-standard popular fiction.

The foreshadowing may be distinguished between "advance notice": for example, "Had I but known then what I know now, I would never have set foot on Baron von Rotschnitzel's private yacht", or the more subtle "advance mention": "a 'simple marker without anticipation' intended to acquire significance later in the narrative, through analeptic recovery (75).' [in other words:]...clues"

The phrase is used to refer to a group of Golden Age mystery writers, mostly female, who wrote novels characterized by the use of the "had I but known" plot in which the narrator keeps key pieces of evidence from the police, apparently for the sole purpose of prolonging their work. 

The HIBK school is associated with the works of Mary Roberts Rinehart, specifically The Circular Staircase (1908), in which "a middle-aged spinster is persuaded by her niece and nephew to rent a country house for the summer. The house they choose belonged to a bank defaulter who had hidden stolen securities in the walls. The gentle, peace-loving trio is plunged into a series of crimes solved with the help of the aunt. This novel is credited with being the first in the "Had-I-But-Known" school."

Other members of the HIBK school include Ethel Lina White and Lenore Glen Offord.

The HIBK school was parodied by Ogden Nash in his poem "Don't Guess, Let Me Tell You":

See also
Narrative mode

References

Narratology